Valyl-tRNA synthetase is an enzyme that in humans is encoded by the VARS gene.

Function 

Aminoacyl-tRNA synthetases catalyze the aminoacylation of tRNA by their cognate amino acid. Because of their central role in linking amino acids with nucleotide triplets contained in tRNAs, aminoacyl-tRNA synthetases are thought to be among the first proteins that appeared in evolution. The protein encoded by this gene belongs to class-I aminoacyl-tRNA synthetase family and is located in the class III region of the major histocompatibility complex.

See also 
Valine-tRNA ligase

References

Further reading